The New Britain naked-backed fruit bat (Dobsonia praedatrix) is a species of megabat in the family Pteropodidae. It is endemic to New Britain island in northern Papua New Guinea.

References

Dobsonia
Bats of Oceania
Endemic fauna of Papua New Guinea
Mammals of Papua New Guinea
Fauna of New Britain
Near threatened animals
Near threatened biota of Oceania
Taxa named by Knud Andersen
Mammals described in 1909
Taxonomy articles created by Polbot
Bats of New Guinea